Auturus is a genus of flat-backed millipedes in the family Euryuridae. There are about 11 described species in Auturus.

Species
These 11 species belong to the genus Auturus:
 Auturus becki Chamberlin, 1951
 Auturus dixianus Chamberlin, 1942
 Auturus erythropygos (Brandt, 1839)
 Auturus evides (Bollman, 1887)
 Auturus florus Causey, 1950
 Auturus georgianus Chamberlin
 Auturus louisianus (Chamberlin, 1918)
 Auturus mcclurkini Causey, 1955
 Auturus mimetes Chamberlin, 1942
 Auturus phanus Chamberlin, 1942
 Auturus scotius Chamberlin, 1942

References

Further reading

 
 

Polydesmida
Millipedes of North America
Articles created by Qbugbot